Augusto dos Santos was the Paraguayan Minister of Communications under President Fernando Lugo.

References

Living people
Government ministers of Paraguay
Year of birth missing (living people)